Cinematographer Vilmos Zsigmond, also formerly credited as William Zsigmond, was nominated for four Academy Awards for Best Cinematography (Close Encounters of the Third Kind, The Deer Hunter, The River, and The Black Dahlia), winning once for his work on Close Encounters of the Third Kind. He also won two American Society of Cinematographers Awards, one Primetime Emmy Award, and one British Academy Film Award.

This article includes all of Zsigmond's credits as a cinematographer both in film and television.

Films

Short films

Documentary

Television

References

Zsigmond, Vilmos